Legitimists may refer to:
Legitimists, Royalists in France who believe that the King of France and Navarre must be chosen according to the simple application of the Salic Law
Jacobitism, the political movement dedicated to the restoration of the Stuart kings to the thrones of England and Scotland
Carlists, a traditionalist, legitimist political movement in Spain seeking, among other things, the establishment of a separate line of the Bourbon family on the Spanish throne
Miguelistas, legitimists of Portugal
Legitimist Party (Nicaragua)
Irish republican legitimism